The first season of The Real Housewives of Salt Lake City, an American reality television series, is broadcast on Bravo. It premiered on November 11, 2020 and was primarily filmed in Salt Lake City, Utah. Lisa Shannon, Dan Peirson, Sergio Alfaro, Michaline Babich, Luke Neslage, Lori Gordon, Adam Karpe and Andy Cohen.

Season 1 of the Real Housewives of Salt Lake City focuses on the lives of Lisa Barlow, Mary Cosby, Heather Gay, Meredith Marks, Whitney Rose and Jen Shah. It premiered on November 11, 2020.

Production and Crew
Lisa Shannon, Dan Peirson, Sergio Alfaro, Michaline Babich, Luke Neslage, Lori Gordon, Adam Karpe and Andy Cohen are recognized as the season's executive producers; it is produced and distributed by Shed Media. The series was announced at the BravoCon fan convention in New York City on November 16, 2019.

Cast
The cast members consisting of Lisa Barlow, Mary Cosby, Heather Gay, Meredith Marks, Whitney Rose and Jen Shah were announced on September 9, 2020.

 Due to COVID-19 restrictions, the Housewives are seated in separate chairs rather than the usual couches.

Episodes

References

External links
 

 

2020 American television seasons
2021 American television seasons
Salt Lake City (season 1)